is a Japanese mystery film and television show adapted from the best-selling novel of the same name by Takeru Kaidō. The story revolves around a hospital with a team of doctors known for their success with a type of heart surgery. After a series of failed operations that result in the patient's death, an internal investigation is initiated, led by a doctor named Taguchi and a brash government official. In the original novel the main character Taguchi, was a male doctor in his forties. However, for the film adaptation TBS suggested replacing the character with a young female resulting in Yūko Takeuchi being cast as in the role. For the TV show, Taguchi is a man, with Atsushi Itō playing the role.

Plot
A top notch seven-member team of doctors and nurses known as “Team Batista” are Tojo University Hospital’s pride and joy. The medical team performs a prominent heart surgery known as the Batista Operation which has a normal 60% success rate, but the team has consecutively pulled off twenty six successful surgeries. However, the streak is broken after a string of three procedures end in their patients' deaths. Consequently, an internal investigation is launched with hospital therapist Kohei Taguchi in charge of uncovering the truth behind the incidents. When Taguchi is unable to find any definitive information, the deaths are labeled as unexplainable accidents. The evaluation is subsequently dismissed by Keisuke Shiratori, an investigator with the Ministry of Health, Labour and Welfare, who re-launches the investigation on the basis that the deaths were actually murders.

Film

The filmis based on an award-winning novel and its popularity resulted in roughly 25 movie studios and television networks fighting over adaptation rights, in the end TBS won out. The novel was adapted for the screen by Hiroshi Saitō and Mitsuharu Makita. The film began shooting October 7, 2008 and was primarily shot in Tokyo. The Glorious Team Batista was in theaters on February 9, 2008 and became a commercial success, grossing 264 million yen from 284 screens its opening weekend.

When The Glorious Team Batista was screened at the Udine Far East Film Festival, it received mediocre reviews. Todd Brown of Twitch wrote:

"The characters are stock at best, the story arc blandly predictable and the ending drawn out beyond reasonable bounds.  The technical end is solid and the performances good enough but the script for this just feels far more like a lengthy episode of prime time network television from the pre-HBO era – much more Murder She Wrote or Matlock than Dexter – than it feels like the feature film – adapted from a popular mystery novel – that it is.  Horrible?  No, just horribly bland."

Similarly, Ross Chen of Love HK Film wrote:

"...The Glorious Team Batista is a ragingly obvious commercial film, with manufactured characters, drama, and situations that seem ripped from a pulpy bestseller you might find featured in an airport bookstore (Surprise! The film is based on a novel.). This is a big-screen medical thriller built for mainstream audiences, and it seldom delivers anything beyond the required or expected... Regardless, the whole is too glossy and commercial to be anymore more than an average medical thriller suited to undemanding audiences."

A sequel to the film titled The Triumphant Return of General Rouge was released March 7, 2009. The sequel adapted from "General Rouge no Gaisen," which is the third book in the same novel series as "Team Batista." Yūko Takeuchi and Hiroshi Abe reprised their roles, with director Yoshihiro Nakamura also returning. Masato Sakai was cast as the film's antagonist.

Cast
 Yūko Takeuchi – Kimiko Taguchi
 Hiroshi Abe – Keisuke Shiratori
 Koji Kikkawa – Kyoichi Kiryu
 Hiroyuki Ikeuchi – Ryo Narumi
 Tetsuji Tamayama – Toshiki Sakai
 Haruka Igawa – Naomi Otomo
 Hiromasa Taguchi – Takayuki Haba
 Naoki Tanaka – Kōichirō Himuro
 Shiro Sano – Yuji Kakitani
 Yōko Nogiwa – Makoto Fujiwara
 Sei Hiraizumi – Seiichiro Kurosaki
 Jun Kunimura – Gonta Takashina

TV Show

Cast
 Atsushi Itō – Kōhei Taguchi
 Tōru Nakamura – Keisuke Shiratori
 Tsuyoshi Ihara – Kyoichi Kiryu
 Daisuke Miyagawa – Ryo Narumi
 Hiroki Suzuki – Toshiki Sakai
 Yumiko Shaku – Naomi Otomo
 Masahiro Toda – Takayuki Haba
 Yū Shirota – Kōichirō Himuro
 Shingo Tsurumi – Yūji Kakitani
 Yuko Natori – Makoto Fujiwara
 Ryuzo Hayashi – Kenta Takashina
 Mayumi Asaka – Kanako Miyahara
 Takaaki Enoki – Ichirō Kurosaki
 Chika Uemura – Kyoko Hoshino
 Akio Yokoyama – Shuzo Taguchi
 Risa Saiki – Midori Taguchi
 Mikeo Ishii – Akane Taguchi
 Kaoru Okunuki – Kishikawa Marie
 Houka Kinoshita – Tamotsu Kishikawa

Episodes
{|class="wikitable" width="98%"
|- style="border-bottom:3px solid #CCF"
! Episode !! Title !! Writer !! Director !! Original airdate

|}

References

External links
 Official website: Novel
 Official website: Film
 Official website: Television show

2008 films
2008 Japanese television series debuts
2008 Japanese television series endings
2011 Japanese television series debuts
2011 Japanese television series endings
Japanese mystery drama films
2000s Japanese-language films
Japanese drama television series
Fuji TV dramas
Japanese medical television series
Television shows based on Japanese novels